During World War I, Venezuela maintained a position of neutrality in the four years of the conflict during the dictatorship of Juan Vicente Gómez. Por its position, his government was pressured and threatened by the conflict belligerants, and Gómez was accused of having pro-German sympathies. Gómez used the position of Victorino Márquez Bustillos  as provisional president, in practice a "prime minister", to refuse to discuss changing his stance.

Despite the neutrality of gomecismo during the conflict, there were Venezuelans that fought in World War I. While the majority of them served in the French Foreign Legion, there were exceptions that enlisted in the Ottoman or German armies. Several of them were condecorated for their service.

See also 
 Venezuela during World War II

References

Bibliography 
 

History of Venezuela
World War I by country